Indarbela orima is a moth in the family Cossidae. It is found in Peru and was first described by Herbert Druce in 1906.

References

Metarbelinae
Moths described in 1906